Daniel McKenzie (born 17 May 1996) is a professional Australian rules footballer who plays for the St Kilda Football Club in the Australian Football League (AFL).

McKenzie was drafted with pick 22 of the 2014 National Draft from the Oakleigh Chargers. He made his debut against  in round 5 of the 2015 season. In mid 2019, McKenzie signed a contract extension that will keep him with St Kilda until the end of the 2022 season.

He played junior football for Blackburn in the Eastern Football Netball League and school football for Caulfield Grammar School.

References

External links

1996 births
Living people
St Kilda Football Club players
Oakleigh Chargers players
Australian rules footballers from Victoria (Australia)
Sandringham Football Club players
People educated at Caulfield Grammar School